Molonglo can refer to:

Molonglo – a suburb in Canberra
Molonglo Internment Camp and Molonglo Settlement - a WWI internment camp which then became a temporary suburb, located in what is now Fyshwick, Australian Capital Territory
Molonglo River
Molonglo Plains
Molonglo electorate
Molonglo Valley – District of Canberra
Molonglo Observatory Synthesis Telescope